Basut-e Hajji Hasan (also Romanized as Basūt-e Ḩājjī Ḩasan; also known as Basūt and Basūt-e Pā’īn) is a village in Bahu Kalat Rural District, Dashtiari District, Chabahar County, Sistan and Baluchestan Province, Iran. At the 2006 census, its population was 806, in 151 families.

References 

Populated places in Chabahar County